Phillip Ferdinand Mahre (born May 10, 1957) is a former World Cup alpine ski racer, widely regarded as one of the greatest American skiers of all time.  His total of 27 World Cup race wins is fourth among Americans, only behind Lindsey Vonn, Mikaela Shiffrin, and Bode Miller.

Biography
Born in Yakima, Washington, Phil and his twin brother Steve (four minutes younger) were both world class ski racers and competed on the World Cup circuit from 1976 to 1984. Starting with the 1978 season, Mahre finished in the top three in the World Cup overall standings for six consecutive seasons, winning the title in the final three (1981, 1982, and 1983). The Mahre twins retired from World Cup racing in March 1984 at age 26.

On February 9, 2010, Mahre was the U.S. torch bearer to carry the 2010 Vancouver torch across the border at the Blaine-Surrey Peace Arch.

Early years
Despite their very similar appearance and according to the delivering physician, the Mahre twins are fraternal rather than identical twins.

By the age of 12, the Mahre twins' future was so promising that ski manufacturers sent them free skis, and the next year Rossignol tried to sign them to a career-long contract, which their father declined.  Eventually they would use skis made by an American company, K2, throughout their career.  K2 was located on Vashon Island, just west of Seattle, a few hours northwest of White Pass. The Mahre twins worked extensively with the company throughout their careers, developing custom race skis ideally suited to their needs.

Mahre graduated from Naches High School and also played football as a blocking back and linebacker for the Rangers.

U.S. Ski Team
Mahre earned a spot on the U.S. Ski Team in early 1973 at age 15. He was selected to the "A" team following the 1975 season and made his World Cup debut in December 1975 at Val d'Isère, France.  Two months later he competed at the 1976 Winter Olympics in Innsbruck, Austria, taking fifth in the giant slalom at age 18. He made his first podium in March with a second in a giant slalom at Copper Mountain, Colorado, and finished the 1976 World Cup season in 14th place in the overall standings.  He won his first World Cup race the next season, a giant slalom at Val d'Isère in December 1976, and followed it up with a slalom win in March at Sun Valley, defeating the man who became his primary rival, the legendary Swede Ingemar Stenmark, with twin brother Steve taking third.  Mahre finished ninth in the overall standings for 1977.

The following season established Mahre as one of the best ski racers in the world.  In 1978 he placed second in the overall standings, followed by third in 1979, despite breaking his lower left tibia in early March at the pre-Olympic giant slalom at Whiteface near Lake Placid. At the 1980 Winter Olympics in Lake Placid, he took the silver in the slalom behind Stenmark, along combined title (not an Olympic event in 1980, but official as a concurrent World Championship title). He again finished third in the overall World Cup standings for 1980, and won the first of four consecutive discipline titles in the combined.

World Cup Overall Champion (1981–83)
Mahre's career reached its zenith over the next three seasons.  He won the most prestigious title in alpine skiing, the overall World Cup title, three consecutive years from 1981–83.  He narrowly edged Ingemar Stenmark, who had previously won three consecutive overall titles from 1976–78, by only 6 points to capture his first title in 1981.  Mahre won primarily due to his results in the downhill and combined events, as Stenmark was uncomfortable in the downhill event. Mahre's finest year was 1982 when he took the event titles in the giant slalom, slalom, and combined, as well as the overall title. Mahre had eight wins and 20 podium finishes, and his 309 points were well ahead of Stenmark's 211.  Twin brother Steve finished third overall at 183 points, and also won the World Championship in the giant slalom at Schladming, Austria. In 1983, Mahre again beat Stenmark by a large margin for the overall title, along with taking a second straight GS title.

Only four other Americans have won the World Cup overall title: Tamara McKinney (1983), Bode Miller (2005, 2008), Lindsey Vonn (2008, 2009, 2010, 2012), Mikaela Shiffrin (2017, 2018, 2019).

1984 Olympics
At the 1984 Winter Olympics in Sarajevo, Mahre again medaled in the slalom, this time taking the gold while Steve won the silver for a Mahre twin 1–2 sweep. Steve had led the first of two runs, skiing flawlessly and building a large half-second lead over Swede Jonas Nilsson with Phil in third place, another two-tenths back.  Phil skied a fine second run to grab the lead, then Nilsson skied next and faltered, dropping out of the medals.  Steve skied down last, needing only a solid run to take the gold, but a series of mistakes dropped him into second place, and Phil became the Olympic champion. Meanwhile, unknown to the racers, Phil's wife Holly had given birth to their second child, a son, in Arizona an hour before the race started. Phil did not find out about it until a TV interview after the race.

The Mahres won two of the five alpine skiing medals taken by Americans, all from the Northwest. Portland's Bill Johnson (downhill) and Seattle's Debbie Armstrong also won gold and Christin Cooper of Sun Valley took the silver for an American 1–2 finish in the women's giant slalom.

The Mahre twins raced a limited World Cup schedule during the 1984 season, and retired from the circuit in early March at age 26. Phil ended his career with 27 World Cup race victories, at the time second only to Stenmark's 79 wins among men's racers (who ended his career in 1989 with 86 wins), while Steve finished with 9 wins.

Post-retirement
In 1985, Phil and his brother released their book No Hill Too Fast, which chronicles their childhood and World Cup careers, and includes a series of instructional sections titled "How to Ski the Mahre Way".  That same year the twins established the Mahre Training Center in Keystone, Colorado, and continue to run it to this day in Deer Valley, Utah.  The twins attended the Bob Bondurant School of Driving in the fall of 1988 and began competing in auto racing. In 1988 Phil jumped to the World Pro Ski Tour winning the slalom title in 1989.  Both he and brother Steve raced on the World Pro Ski Tour under the Coors Light banner.  They are currently racing in the Grand American Road Racing Association Koni Challenge series, in the Grand Sport class.

Comeback
In 2006, at the age of 49, Phil Mahre decided it was time to come out of retirement and make another run at qualifying for the U.S. Nationals by the age of 50.  After nearly qualifying for the U.S. National Championships in 2008, Phil Mahre's 2008–09 season was cut short by a knee injury.

A longtime racer on K2 skis during his World Cup career, Mahre attempted to make his comeback using Volant, then Head skis.

World Cup results

Season standings

Points were only awarded for top ten finishes thru 1979, top 15 thru 1991 (see scoring system).

World championship results 

From 1948 through 1980, the Winter Olympics were also the World Championships for alpine skiing.
At the World Championships from 1954 through 1980, the combined was a "paper race" using the results of the three events (DH, GS, SL).

Olympic results

Racing record

SCCA National Championship Runoffs

See also
 World Fit
List of Olympic medalist families

References

Bibliography

External links
 
 

1957 births
Living people
American male alpine skiers
Olympic gold medalists for the United States in alpine skiing
Olympic silver medalists for the United States in alpine skiing
Medalists at the 1980 Winter Olympics
Medalists at the 1984 Winter Olympics
Alpine skiers at the 1976 Winter Olympics
Alpine skiers at the 1980 Winter Olympics
Alpine skiers at the 1984 Winter Olympics
FIS Alpine Ski World Cup champions
Twin sportspeople
American twins
SCCA National Championship Runoffs winners
Racing drivers from Washington (state)
Sportspeople from Yakima, Washington